The 2015 Copa del Rey de Baloncesto was the 79th edition of the Spanish King's Basketball Cup. It was managed by the ACB and was held in Las Palmas, in the Gran Canaria Arena on February 19–22, 2014. Real Madrid won their 24th cup, Rudy Fernández was named MVP.

Qualified teams
The seven first qualified after the first half of the 2014–15 ACB regular season qualified to the tournament. As Herbalife Gran Canaria, host team, finished between the seven first teams, the eighth qualified joined the Copa del Rey.

Draw

The 2015 Copa del Rey de Baloncesto was drawn on 19 January 2015 at approximately 12:00 CET and was broadcast live on YouTube and on TV in many countries. The seeded teams were paired in the quarterfinals with the non-seeded teams. There were not any restrictions for the draw of the semifinals. As in recent seasons, the first qualified team plays its quarterfinal game on Thursday.

Bracket

Quarterfinals

Semifinals

Final

References

External links
Copa del Rey official website
Copa del Rey news 

Copa del Rey de Baloncesto
2014–15 in Spanish basketball cups